Kosagovo is a rural locality (a selo) in Nebylovskoye Rural Settlement, Yuryev-Polsky District, Vladimir Oblast, Russia. The population was 11 as of 2010.

Geography 
Kosagovo is located 32 km southeast of Yuryev-Polsky (the district's administrative centre) by road. Lykovo is the nearest rural locality.

References 

Rural localities in Yuryev-Polsky District